Archibald "Archie" C. Black (May 17, 1883 in  – May 14, 1956) was a Canadian rower who competed in the 1924 Summer Olympics. He was born in Winnipeg and died in Vancouver. In 1924 he won the silver medal as crew member of the Canadian boat in the coxless fours event.

References

External links
profile
 Profile on Sports Reference

1884 births
1956 deaths
Rowers from Winnipeg
Canadian male rowers
Olympic rowers of Canada
Olympic silver medalists for Canada
Rowers at the 1924 Summer Olympics
Olympic medalists in rowing
Medalists at the 1924 Summer Olympics